Kastro tis Orias ("Castle of the Fair Maiden") may refer to:

 Kastro tis Orias (ballad), a Byzantine ballad and folk story, probably based on the Sack of Amorium.

Various medieval fortresses named for the legend:

Greece 
 Gardiki Castle, Arcadia
 Kastro tis Orias, Cephalonia
 Kastro tis Orias, Chios
 Kastro tis Orias, Kilkis
 Kastro tis Orias, Kythnos
 Kastro tis Orias, Lemnos
 Kastro tis Orias, Mani, Laconia
 Kastro tis Orias, Servia
 Kastro tis Orias, Tempe
 Kastro tis Orias, Thasos
 Kalavryta Castle, Messenia
 Ochia Castle, Elis
 Platamon Castle, Pieria
 Salmeniko Castle, Achaea
 Salona Castle, Phocis
 Siderokastron, Phthiotis

Turkey 
 Demre Castle, (Lycia) Antalya Province
 Görele Castle, (Pontus) Giresun Province

Albania 
 Terihati castle (Northern Epirus), Gjirokastër county
 Palaiokastron castle (near Labova e Kryqit) (Northern Epirus), Gjirokastër county